, born in Osaka in 1950, is a Japanese composer and music teacher. He teaches at Kyushu University (Faculty of Design). He has written fifteen books and done both chamber music and symphonies. In the 1990s his visual works were performed at festivals in Palermo and Germany.

Links 
  Personal Website

References 

1950 births
Japanese composers
Japanese male composers
Japanese music educators
Academic staff of Kyushu University
Living people
Musicians from Osaka
21st-century Japanese composers
20th-century Japanese composers
20th-century Japanese educators
21st-century Japanese educators
20th-century Japanese male musicians
21st-century Japanese male musicians
Aichi Prefectural University of the Arts alumni